Danger! Women at Work is a 1943 American comedy film directed by Sam Newfield and written by Martin Mooney. The film stars Patsy Kelly, Mary Brian, Isabel Jewell, Wanda McKay, Betty Compson and Cobina Wright Sr.. The film was released on August 23, 1943, by Producers Releasing Corporation.

Plot

Pert and Marie (Mary Brian and Isabel Jewell) are gas station attendants and Terry (Patsy Kelly) drives a cab, all doing their part for the war effort. Terry inherits a bungalow in Glendale and a 10-ton truck from her recently-deceased Uncle Joe, and is at her wits' end as to what to do with the rig. Terry and Pert are advised to go into the trucking business by Pert's boyfriend, Danny (Jack Randall). The girls are soon approached by someone named Benny (Vince Barnett) from the finance company who threatens to repossess the truck if the mortgage on it isn't settled. Danny introduces the girls to his boss and he agrees to pay them $100 if they bring back a load of nitroglycerin back from Las Vegas, but they need to carry cargo there in order for them to travel legally on the highways, so they advertise. They are then visited by a smooth operator named Duke Edwards (Gary Bruce) who promises them $125 to drive a load of furniture to Las Vegas in time for the opening of a gambling casino. They take up the offer and hit the road, but not before Terry gets her driver's license and then a trucking license with her fiancé, Pete (Warren Hymer), who is also a trucker.

Along the way to Vegas, they pick up several hitchhikers: a rich society matron named Regina (Cobina Wright) with amnesia, Madame Sappho the Fortune-Teller (Betty Compson), and a young woman named Doris Bendix (Wanda McKay), the daughter of a millionaire, who is running away from a family who wants her to marry a rich engineer, despite her considerations. Before crossing the Nevada border, a motorcycle patrolman warns them that they cannot drive at night in that area, and that they must stay at the motel up the road for the night. Once at the motel, they find themselves a couple of seedy characters in the lounge and play a round of craps with them. Terry wins big, and claims they never played a game of craps in their entire lives. The losing gamblers overhear on the radio about Miss Bendix and the $5000 reward for her location. Sam, the bellboy at the motel (Fred 'Snowflake' Toones), points her photo out in a newspaper to them. Meanwhile, Regina's husband, Mr. North (a rich rancher and former senator), is trying to locate his wife. He asks the motel manager about her, and is told she had just left with several other girls in a truck.

The women all later end up in jail after the gamblers send out a warrant. Pete and Danny rush to Nevada to provide any help they can. Terry explains everything that occurred to Judge Higginbottom, clears everything up, and he lets them off. He also ends up marrying Terry & Pete, Pert & Danny, and Doris and her chosen fiancé, Tommy (Michael Kirk). Terry smashes a vase over Regina's head, and she regains her memory, reuniting with her husband.

Cast          
Patsy Kelly as Terry Olsen
Mary Brian as Pert
Isabel Jewell as Marie
Wanda McKay as Doris Bendix
Betty Compson as Madame Sappho
Cobina Wright Sr. as Regina
Jack Randall as Danny 
Warren Hymer as Pete
Vince Barnett as Benny
Michael Kirk as Tommy

Additional info
This was Patsy Kelly's last starring role in a motion picture. Though endeared by the public, she was soon after blackballed by the major studios in Hollywood for her refusal to discontinue her homosexual activity off-camera. She paid the bills over the next decade or so by appearing on radio, TV game shows, the occasional teleplay, and "working" as a domestic for Tallulah Bankhead. She did not appear in another film for seventeen years, until Please Don't Eat the Daisies in 1960, and from thereafter appeared in only supporting roles.

References

External links
 

1943 films
American comedy films
1943 comedy films
Producers Releasing Corporation films
Films directed by Sam Newfield
American black-and-white films
1940s English-language films
1940s American films